Walton and Roslin Halls is a mixed-used commercial and residential building that was built in two parts.  They are located at the corner of Washington and Walton Streets in the Dorchester neighborhood of Boston, Massachusetts, and extend south along Washington Street.  The first of the two buildings, that at 3-5 Walton Street and 702-708 Washington, is a three-story brick and wood-frame structure built in 1897 to a design by Cornelius A. Russell; the southern portion was completed a year later.  The building housed a commercial space on the ground floor, and residential units above.

The building, which was one of the first of its type built south of Codman Square, was listed on the National Register of Historic Places in 2013.

See also
National Register of Historic Places listings in southern Boston, Massachusetts

References

Residential buildings in Boston
Residential buildings on the National Register of Historic Places in Massachusetts
Commercial buildings on the National Register of Historic Places in Massachusetts
Dorchester, Boston
National Register of Historic Places in Boston
Commercial buildings in Boston